Oktyabryukhov and Dekabryukhov is a 1928 Soviet drama film directed by O. Iskander and Aleksei Smirnov.

Plot 
Nikolay Dekabryukhov as a result of the revolution throws his wife and leaves the country to Paris, where he tells the local people about his exploits. Meanwhile, his wife is marrying his brother.

Cast 
 Georgi Astafyev
 Leonid Barbe
 Afanasi Belov
 Valeriy Gakkebush as White Emigrant with a Stain
 Dmitriy Kapka
 T. Kochkina
 V. Korsch

References

External links 
 

1928 films
1920s Russian-language films
Soviet drama films